Harold Marvin Rayner (July 27, 1888 – December 8, 1954) was an American fencer and modern pentathlete. He won a bronze medal in the team foil event at the 1920 Summer Olympics.

References

External links
 

1888 births
1954 deaths
American male foil fencers
American male modern pentathletes
Olympic modern pentathletes of the United States
Fencers at the 1912 Summer Olympics
Fencers at the 1920 Summer Olympics
Fencers at the 1928 Summer Olympics
Modern pentathletes at the 1920 Summer Olympics
Olympic bronze medalists for the United States in fencing
People from Glen Ridge, New Jersey
Medalists at the 1920 Summer Olympics
19th-century American people
20th-century American people